2014 Hockey India League Players' Auction or HIL Closed Bid was the mini auction/closed bid of players for the second season of the professional field hockey tournament, Hockey India League. The auction took place on 22 November at Lalit Hotel in New Delhi.

A total of 154 players were auctioned out of which 95 were Indian players and 59 were foreign players from 14 countries. The base price for the players varied from 2,600 to 25,000. The salary cap available to each franchise for the auction was increased from 650,000 (4 crores) to 725,000 (4.46 crores) as per the requests of the franchises. The players were signed for the term of two years. During the closed bid, Kalinga Lancers, the new franchise of the Hockey India League, bought its 24 players while rest of the five franchises bought players due to the permanent withdrawals to complete their squads.

Transfers
Transfer window for second season of HIL was open from 19 August to 30 September.

Withdrawals

Auction
Following is the list of players bought in the auction:

Replacement signings
Franchises can sign players after the HIL auction, as replacement of contracted players who are not available to play due to injuries and national commitments. Under HIL rules, the replacements have to be chosen from the pool of players who went unsold in the auction.

Unsold players
Following unsold players were added to the reserve pool (according to their base price):

$25,000
  Seo Jong-Ho
  George Pinner
$22,000
  Juan Martín López
$20,000
  Filip Neusser
$18,000
  Gabriel Dabanch
$15,000
  Andrew Charter
  Azlan Misron
  Clinton Panther
  Firhan Ashaari
  Fitri Saari
  Guillermo Schickendantz
  Juan Ignacio Gilardi
  Juan Manuel Vivaldi
  Oliver Korn
  Rhett Halkett
$12,000
  Deepak Thakur
  Didar Singh
  Syed Muhammad Zaheer
$10,000
  Arun Panchia
  Jagdish Singh Gill
  Mark Pearson
  Miguel Da Graca
  Rassie Pieterse
  Satiago Miguel Montelli
  Thornton McDade
$7,500
  Guido Martin Barreiros Lopez

$7,000
  Inderjeet Singh
$6,000
  Baljit Singh
$5,200
  Ajmer Singh
  Prabhdeep Singh Powar
$5,000
  Ignacio Jose Manes
  Ignacio Santiago Salas
  Juan Tubio
  Julian Allen Hykes
  Marcos Tubio
  Martin Zalatel
  Pedro Budeisky
$2,600
  Abhinav Kumar Pandey
  Aiyappa Ranjan Paradanda
  Anand Lakra
  Arumugam Subramani
  Arun Rawat
  Baljit Singh
  Biddappa K.D.
  Birsu Bhengra
  Captain Singh
  Dayananda Singh Chanamthabam
  Deepak Kishor Ekka
  Gurpreet Singh
  Gurvinder Singh
  Harmandeep Singh
  Harmanpreet Singh
  Harpreet Singh
  Jagdeep Dayal
  Jaspreet Singh Rehal
  Jitender Saroha

$2,600
  Joga Singh
  Lovedeep Singh
  Lovepreet Singh
  Manish Bishnoi
  Manikanta Venkatesshwarlu
  Manish Sharma
  Manish Yadav
  Manjinder Singh Boparai
  Mohammed Riyazuddin
  Mohan Muthanna Bollachanda
  Mohit Singh Thakur
  Mucketira Gannapathy Poonacha
  Muddappa Kariappa Maletira
  Nadeem Uddin
  Nanak Singh
  Narinder Pal Singh Dhillon
  Naveen Antil
  Naveen Kumar Prasad
  Nikhil Saroha
  Owais Ahmed
  Prabhjot Singh Jr,
  Pradeep Raj Kumar
  Raju Pal
  Rana Pratap
  Rinel Singh Khadangbam
  Sagar Harale
  Sandeep Kumar Singh
  Sanjay Paswan
  Sanjib Dung Dung
  Sarin Edavakath
  Simranjit Singh Chahal
  Subodh Tirkey
  Sumit Chauhan
  Tarandeep Singh
  Vikas Choudhary

References

auction
auction 2014